Moldava is a municipality and village in Teplice District in the Ústí nad Labem Region of the Czech Republic. It has about 200 inhabitants.

Administrative parts
The village of Nové Město is an administrative part of Moldava.

Geography
It lies in the Ore Mountains.

Sport
There is a ski resort on the Bouřňák mountain near Nové Město.

References

Villages in Teplice District
Villages in the Ore Mountains
Ski areas and resorts in the Czech Republic